Najeeb Qahtan al-Shaabi (born 1953 in Sha'ab, Lahj, Yemen – died 24 May 2021 in Aden, Yemen) was a Yemeni politician who was a candidate in the 1999 presidential election in Yemen. He ran as an Independent, despite being a member of the General People's Congress, against President Ali Abdullah Saleh. He received 3.8% of the vote.

He served as a member of the House of Representatives from 1991 till his death 2021.

He was the son of Qahtan Muhammad al-Shaabi, the first president of South Yemen. On 24 May 2021, Najeeb died of COVID-19 in 
Aden, Yemen during the COVID-19 pandemic in Yemen.

References

1953 births
2021 deaths
General People's Congress (Yemen) politicians
Sons of national leaders
People from Lahij Governorate
Deaths from the COVID-19 pandemic in Yemen